Muscott is a hamlet in Norton  civil parish in the south of the English county of Northamptonshire.

External links

Hamlets in Northamptonshire
West Northamptonshire District